The Sands of Evie is a sandy beach landform near the village of Evie on Mainland Orkney, Scotland, protected by the Point of Hellia headland. This beach forms the southern boundary of Aikerness Bay, an element of Eynhallow Sound. Immediately to the east is Gurness, a rather well preserved Iron Age broch. A Pictish slab was discovered on the Sands of Evie in 1967 and is now housed in Orkney Museum.

See also
 Costa Head

References

Landforms of Orkney
Beaches of Scotland
Mainland, Orkney